Jahangir Khan (Pashto/ born 10 December 1963) is a former World No. 1 professional Pakistani squash player. He won the World Open title six times, and the British Open title ten times (1982-1991). Jahangir Khan is widely regarded as the greatest squash player of all time.

Early life 
Khan was born into Pashtun family from Neway Kelay Payan, Peshawar. During his career he won the World Open six times and the British Open a record ten consecutive times. He retired as a player in 1993, and has served as President of the World Squash Federation from 2002 to 2008. Later in 2008, he became Emeritus President of the World Squash Federation.

He is the son of Roshan Khan, brother of Torsam Khan and a cousin of both Rehmat Khan and British singer Natasha Khan (better known as Bat for Lashes.

He currently lives in Karachi, Pakistan with his wife Ghazala (m.1999) and his three children.

Career 
Jahangir Khan was coached initially by his father Roshan, the 1957 British Open champion, then by his brother Torsam. After his brother's sudden death he was coached by his cousin Rehmat, who guided Khan through most of his career. In 1979, the Pakistan selectors decided not to select Khan to play in the world championships in Australia but he entered the World Amateur Individual Championship, at the age of 15, and became the youngest-ever winner of that event. In November 1979, Torsam Khan, who had been one of the leading international squash players in the 1970s, died suddenly of a heart attack during Australian Open match in Adelaide Australia. Torsam's death profoundly affected Khan. He considered quitting the game, but decided to pursue a career in the sport as a tribute to his brother.

He retired as a player in 1993, and has served as President of the World Squash Federation from 2002 to 2008, later became Emeritus President.

World Open final appearances

British Open final appearances

Honors and awards
 1981 – At age 17 became the youngest winner of the World Open, beating Australia's Geoff Hunt in final.
 1984 – Featured on a Government of Pakistan issued postage stamp. 
 1999 – Sport and Youth Award by French Government
2005 – Times Award – Time Magazine named Khan as one of Asia's Heroes in the last 60 years.
 2007 – Awarded an honorary degree of Doctorate of Philosophy by London Metropolitan University.
 2017 – Featured on a Government of Japan issued commemorative stamp
 2018 – Winner of the 8th Asian Award for Outstanding Achievement in Sport

Philanthropy
In 2018, Khan became global President of Shahid Afridi Foundation (SAF) in a ceremony held at Japan. SAF was founded by former cricketer Shahid Afridi which aims to provide healthcare and education facilities in Pakistan.

See also 
 List of squash players
 Jansher Khan
 World Open
 British Open Squash Championships
 World Squash Federation
 List of Pakistanis

References

External links

 
 
 The Incredible Khans of Squash: Part III Jahangir
 The Khan Family, A Squash Dynasty Part III
 Pakistan Squash – The Khan Supremacy Part VII
 Jahangir Khan page at Squashpics.com
 Details of Jahangir's rivalry with Jansher Khan
 Article on Jahangir's hardball squash rivalry with Mark Talbott
 World Squash Awards
 The KhanSquash Management Group – (archived)

Pakistani male squash players
Recipients of Hilal-i-Imtiaz
Recipients of the Pride of Performance
Pashtun people
1963 births
Living people
Khan family (squash)
Government Islamia College alumni